Nudacotylidae is a family of trematodes belonging to the order Plagiorchiida.

Genera:
 Neocotyle Travassos, 1923
 Nudacotyle  Barker, 1916

References

Plagiorchiida